Helene Bechstein née Capito (26 May 1876 – 20 April 1951) was a German socialite and businesswoman. She was an etiquette tutor for Adolf Hitler and was the wife of Edwin Bechstein, the owner and later majority shareholder of C. Bechstein, a leading manufacturer of pianos.

Background 
Helene Capito was born in Düsseldorf in 1876. Helene married Edwin Bechstein, the son of Carl Bechstein, the owner of the C. Bechstein piano factory. In 1923, following C. Bechstein becoming a limited company, Helene and Carl started buying the majority of shares with Helene speaking in public on the company's behalf. At numerous events, she was heard making antisemitic comments, which led to a number of high-profile musicians boycotting C. Bechstein pianos. In 1934, the company was restructured so that Helene became the majority shareholder. To help raise capital, she sold company property to Hermann Göring through his capacity as Minister President of Prussia.

Hitler 
Bechstein first met Adolf Hitler in 1921 through Dietrich Eckart at her Berchtesgaden Villa. She took a liking to him and when he was imprisoned after the failed Beer Hall Putsch, she would regularly visit him in prison and once claimed to the prison that he was her adopted son. Upon Hitler's release, Bechstein introduced him to German high society in Berlin. Along with Elsa Bruckmann and Winifred Wagner, she helped to teach Hitler table manners and helped reform his public image. Both Bechstein and Hitler grew close to each other, with Bechstein giving Hitler gifts including a RM26,000 Mercedes and calling him "Wölfchen" ("little wolf"), stating she would have liked to have had him as a son. Hitler reciprocated by allegedly giving her an original manuscript of Mein Kampf. The Bechsteins both publicly funded Hitler, giving him the funds to continue publishing Völkischer Beobachter.

When the Nazis came to power in 1933, Hitler awarded her the Golden Party Badge in 1934. Bechstein herself did not join the Nazi Party until 1944. Bechstein had hoped that Hitler would marry her daughter.

Later life 
After Nazi Germany's surrender in the Second World War, C. Bechstein was commandeered by the Allies in the US Occupation Zone and Bechstein's shares were confiscated by the Americans. The company was not permitted to start making pianos again until 1948. Bechstein herself was sentenced to 60 days hard labour and had 30% of her assets stripped from her for being a Nazi collaborator. She died in 1951.

References 

1876 births
1951 deaths
Nazi Party members
German socialites
20th-century German businesswomen
20th-century German businesspeople
Businesspeople from Düsseldorf
Bechstein family